Dictyna latens is a species of spider found in Europe to Central Asia.

See also 
 List of Dictynidae species

References

External links 

Dictynidae
Spiders of Europe
Spiders of Asia
Spiders described in 1775
Taxa named by Johan Christian Fabricius